Thelasiinae is an orchid subtribe in the tribe Podochileae.

See also
 Taxonomy of the Orchidaceae

References

External links

 
Orchid subtribes